World of Fantasy is the twelfth studio album by the Japanese electronica band Capsule, released on May 25, 2011, in Japan. The album was originally due for release with the title of Killer Wave. After the 2011 Tōhoku earthquake occurred on March 11, 2011, Yasutaka Nakata announced that the album's release (which was previously announced as March 23, 2011) was postponed and due for release at an unknown date for cover art rework and renaming. "Killer Wave" was then considered a "working title". This is the first album of the duo with all songs sung by the vocalist Toshiko Koshijima. It is also their first completely English-language album.

The digital single "World of Fantasy" was released via iTunes on February 8, 2011. Meanwhile, "Prime Time" was used in a commercial for Vantan Design Institute, first shown on February 21, 2011.

The album sold 7,183 units on its first day of release and 20,814 units on its first week, debuting at the #3 spot in the Oricon Daily and Weekly charts. Despite this being their current highest-charting album, it did not manage to outsell their previous album Player. The album sold a total of 24,603 units in Japan in two weeks.

Track listing
All vocals by Toshiko Koshijima.

iTunes bonus track

References

Links 
 

Capsule (band) albums
Albums produced by Yasutaka Nakata
2011 albums